"Sartorial Eloquence" is a song by English musician Elton John with lyrics written by Tom Robinson. It is the third track of his 1980 album, 21 at 33. In the UK, it was issued as "Sartorial Eloquence", and in the U.S. as "Don't Ya Wanna Play This Game No More?". It reached No. 39 on the Billboard Hot 100 and No. 45 Adult Contemporary, falling just short of the Top 40 in the UK (#44), and making lesser showings in Canada (#57) and Australia (#91).

According to Elizabeth Rosenthal in her book, His Songs: The Musical Journey of Elton John, the song evokes the disappointment of a man left behind which grows in volume and despondency.

Reception
Billboard said the song was highlighted with "a melodic hook" and "steady beat". They also said that Tom Robinson's lyrics on this song should get attention. Record World called it a "vintage John ballad."

B-sides

Like another one of his songs, "Saturday Night's Alright for Fighting", the single had two b-sides, "White Man Danger" and "Cartier" – a 54-second long commercial-like anthem about expensive jewelry.

"Cartier" later appeared on his 1990 box set, To Be Continued, in addition to the 2020 box set Jewel Box, which also contained "White Man Danger".

Charts

References

External links
Elton John - Sartorial Eloquence on YouTube 

Elton John songs
1980 singles
1980 songs
Songs with music by Elton John
Songs written by Tom Robinson
The Rocket Record Company singles